Lactarius controversus, commonly known as the blushing milkcap, is a large funnel-capped fungus within the genus Lactarius, which are collectively known as 'milk caps'. They all exude milky drops (lactate) from the flesh and gills when damaged.

Taxonomy
Accredited to Christian Hendrik Persoon, one of the fathers of mycology.

Description
It is distinguishable mainly by its pinkish-buff gills and rosy markings on the upper cap surface, often arranged in concentric rings. Like other fungi in the genus, it has crumbly, rather than fibrous, flesh, and when this is broken the fungus exudes a white milky liquid. Mature specimens are funnel-shaped, with decurrent gills and a concave cap from 15 to 30 (45) cm in diameter. It has firm, tough flesh, and a stipe which is shorter than the fruitbody is wide. The spore print is creamy-pink in colour.

Lactarius controversus is similar to several white milk-caps in the genus Lactifluus which however are only distantly related: The 'fleecy milk-cap' Lactifluus vellereus, its sister species Lf. bertillonii, and the 'peppery milk-cap' Lf. piperatus all lack the pinkish gills and 'rosy' cap markings.

Distribution and habitat
It is found in Britain, and Europe, and usually grows with species of Salix (Goat willow or Creeping willow) on heaths and moors. It is uncommon. It is widespread in North America growing with aspen, poplar, and willow. Found in the aspen forests of the Sierra Nevada, and has been noted in New Mexico.

Edibility
This mushroom is considered inedible in western Europe due to its very acrid taste, but is eaten, and even commercially collected, in south-eastern European countries such as Serbia and Turkey.

See also
List of Lactarius species

References

controversus
Inedible fungi
Fungi described in 1800
Fungi of Europe
Taxa named by Christiaan Hendrik Persoon